Sonia Priya Sodha (born June 1981) is a British columnist and author. She has written for The Guardian and The Observer. She was a senior adviser to Ed Miliband when he was Leader of the Opposition.

Early life 
Sonia Priya Sodha was born in June 1981.
She describes herself as a "half-Hindu, half-Sikh Indian". She attended a private school, followed by St Hilda's College, Oxford, where she attained a BA (Hons) degree in philosophy, politics and economics and an MPhil in politics.

Career
Sodha worked for the Social Market Foundation and the Race Equality Unit at the Home Office before joining the Institute for Public Policy Research (IPPR) as a research assistant, later becoming a research fellow. She later moved to become Head of the Capabilities Programme at Demos, where she led work in areas including education and public services, and became Head of Policy and Strategy at the Dartington Social Research Unit.

She was a senior adviser to Ed Miliband when he was Leader of the Opposition. Later, when Sodha was head of public services at Which?, she was reported by The Times to have influenced Miliband's policy of breaking up large banks and requiring them to sell branches to stimulate competition. Sodha is now engaged as the chief leader writer at The Observer and deputy opinion editor at The Guardian. She has made appearances on television and radio shows including the Sky News newspaper review, Today, and Question Time, and has presented BBC Radio 4 documentaries on topics including multiculturalism and deliberative democracy.

Sodha has also served as a trustee of City Year UK, a charity that supports role models to help students from disadvantaged communities, and of Trust for London, a charity addressing poverty and equality.

Publications

Notes

References

External links

Sonia Sodha broadcast appearances (YouTube)
Guardian and Observer articles by Sonia Sodha
New Statesman articles by Sonia Sodha
Prospect articles by Sonia Sodha

1981 births
Living people
Alumni of St Hilda's College, Oxford
British Asian writers
British women columnists
British women non-fiction writers
British writers of Indian descent
The Guardian journalists